The San Diego State Aztecs men's tennis team represents San Diego State University in the sport of tennis. The Aztecs compete in the Mountain West Conference (MW) in Division I of the National Collegiate Athletic Association (NCAA). The team is based at the on-campus Aztec Tennis Center, opened in 2005. Aztec men's tennis has won six regular season conference championships and three conference tournament championships as of 2020.

Postseason

Head coaches 
*since 1989

 Hugh Bream (1989–1993)
 John Nelson (1994–2003)
 Gene Carswell (2004–present)

See also 

 Aztec Hall of Fame

References

External links 

 

men's
Mountain West Conference men's tennis
College men's tennis teams in the United States